Lee Hyo-kyeong (born 12 February 1997) is a South Korean professional footballer who plays as a defender for WE League club Albirex Niigata Ladies.

Club career 
Lee made her WE League debut on 12 September 2021.

References 

Living people
1997 births
Women's association football defenders
WE League players
South Korean women's footballers
Albirex Niigata Ladies players
Expatriate women's footballers in Japan
South Korean expatriate footballers